The Fater Engineering Institute is a subsidiary of Khatam al-Anbia in Iran. It is blacklisted by the United States Department of the Treasury, the United Nations, and the European Union.

References

Engineering companies of Iran